Bir Bhadur Chettri  (born 7 December 1955) is an Indian hockey player. Chettri played for the national Indian hockey team at the 1980 Summer Olympics in Moscow. He also played in the 1976 Summer Olympics in Montreal.

1980 Summer Olympics 
In the preliminary rounds, India defeated Tanzania (18-0), Poland (2-0), Cuba (13-0), and the Soviet Union (4-2). They tied with Spain in the third round, but beat them in the finals with a score of 4-3, winning India the gold medal.

References

External links

1955 births
Living people
People from Kalimpong district
Field hockey players from West Bengal
Indian Gorkhas
Olympic field hockey players of India
Olympic medalists in field hockey
Indian male field hockey players
Medalists at the 1980 Summer Olympics
Olympic gold medalists for India
Field hockey players at the 1976 Summer Olympics
Field hockey players at the 1980 Summer Olympics